

0–9
1st Commando Regiment
1st Gorkha Rifles (The Malaun Regiment)
1st Regiment, Armed Forces of Malta
11th Gorkha Rifles
3rd Gorkha Rifles
4th Gorkha Rifles
4 Special Forces Regiment
44 Parachute Regiment
48th Highlanders of Canada
5th Gorkha Rifles (Frontier Force)
5 Special Forces Regiment
8th Gorkha Rifles
9th Gorkha Rifles

A
A Company, SKNDF
Algonquin Regiment (Northern Pioneers)
Antigua and Barbuda Regiment
Argyll and Sutherland Highlanders of Canada (Princess Louise's)
Assam Regiment
Auckland (Countess of Ranfurly's Own) and Northland Regiment
Auckland Infantry Regiment
Azad Kashmir Regiment

B
B Company, SKNDF
Baloch Regiment
Bangladesh Infantry Regiment
Barbados Regiment
Bermuda Regiment
Bihar Regiment
Black Watch (Royal Highland Regiment) of Canada
Brigade of the Guards
Brockville Rifles

C
Calgary Highlanders
Cameron Highlanders of Ottawa (Duke of Edinburgh's Own)
Canadian Grenadier Guards
Canadian Scottish Regiment (Princess Mary's)
Canterbury, and Nelson-Marlborough and West Coast Regiment
Canterbury Infantry Regiment
Cape Breton Highlanders
Cape Town Highlanders
Coldstream Guards
Commando Regiment
Cyprus Regiment

D
Dogra Regiment
Duke of Lancaster's Regiment (King's Lancashire and Border)
Durban Light Infantry

E
East Bengal Regiment
Essex and Kent Scottish Regiment

F
Far North Queensland Regiment
Fiji Infantry Regiment
Frontier Force Regiment
Les Fusiliers Mont-Royal
Les Fusiliers du St-Laurent
Les Fusiliers de Sherbrooke

G
Gajaba Regiment
Gemunu Watch
Garhwal Rifles
Ghana Regiment
Governor General's Foot Guards
Grenadier Guards
The Grenadiers
Grey and Simcoe Foresters

H
Hastings and Prince Edward Regiment
Hauraki Regiment
Hawke's Bay Regiment

I
Irish Guards
Irish Regiment of Canada

J
Jamaica Regiment
Jammu and Kashmir Light Infantry
Jammu and Kashmir Rifles
Jat Regiment

K
Kaffrarian Rifles
Kenya Rifles
Kimberley Regiment
Kumaon Regiment

L
Lake Superior Scottish Regiment
Lincoln and Welland Regiment
London Regiment (disambiguation)
Lorne Scots (Peel, Dufferin and Halton Regiment)
Loyal Edmonton Regiment (4th Bn PPCLI)

M
Madras Regiment
Mahar Regiment
Malawi Rifles
Maratha Light Infantry
Mechanised Infantry Regiment
Mercian Regiment

N
Naga Regiment
Natal Carbineers
New Zealand Rifle Brigade
New Zealand Scottish Regiment
New Zealand Special Air Service
Nigeria Regiment
Nigerian Guards Brigade
NORFORCE
North Saskatchewan Regiment
North Shore (New Brunswick) Regiment
Northern Light Infantry
Nova Scotia Highlanders

O
Otago and Southland Regiment
Otago Infantry Regiment

P
Parachute Regiment
Parachute Regiment
Pilbara Regiment
President's Own Guard Regiment
Prince Alfred's Guard
Princess Louise Fusiliers
Princess of Wales's Own Regiment
Princess of Wales's Royal Regiment (Queen's and Royal Hampshires)
Princess Patricia's Canadian Light Infantry
Punjab Regiment
Punjab Regiment

Q
The Queen's Own Cameron Highlanders of Canada
Queen's Own Rifles of Canada

R
Rajput Regiment
Rajputana Rifles
Rand Light Infantry
Rejimen Askar Melayu DiRaja
Rejimen Renjer DiRaja
Le Régiment de la Chaudière
Le Régiment de Maisonneuve
Le Régiment du Saguenay
The Rifles
Rocky Mountain Rangers
Le Royal 22e Régiment 
Royal Anglian Regiment
Royal Australian Regiment
The Royal Canadian Regiment
Royal Gibraltar Regiment
Royal Gurkha Rifles
Royal Hamilton Light Infantry (Wentworth Regiment)
Royal Highland Fusiliers of Canada
The Royal Hong Kong Regiment (Volunteers)
The Royal Irish Regiment (27th (Inniskilling) 83rd and 87th and The Ulster Defence Regiment)
Royal Irish Rangers
Royal Montreal Regiment
Royal New Brunswick Regiment (Carleton and York)
Royal New South Wales Regiment
Royal New Zealand Infantry Regiment
Royal Newfoundland Regiment
Royal Pacific Islands Regiment
Royal Queensland Regiment
Royal Regiment of Canada 
Royal Regiment of Fusiliers
Royal Regiment of Scotland
Royal Regina Rifles
Royal South Australia Regiment
Royal Tasmania Regiment
Royal Victoria Regiment
Royal Welsh
Royal Western Australia Regiment
Royal Westminster Regiment
Royal Winnipeg Rifles
Ruahine Regiment

S
Scots Guards
Seaforth Highlanders of Canada
Sikh Light Infantry
Sikh Regiment
Sindh Regiment
Singapore Guards
Singapore Infantry Regiment
South African Irish Regiment
Special Air Service
Special Air Service Regiment
Sri Lanka Army Special Forces Regiment
Special Service Group
Sri Lanka Light Infantry
Sri Lanka Sinha Regiment
Stormont, Dundas and Glengarry Highlanders

T
Taranaki Regiment
Toronto Scottish Regiment (Queen Elizabeth The Queen Mother's Own)
Transvaal Scottish Regiment
Trinidad and Tobago Regiment

U
Uganda Rifles

V
Vijayabahu Infantry Regiment
Les Voltigeurs de Québec

W
Welsh Guards
Wellington Regiment (City of Wellington's Own)
Wellington (City of Wellington's Own) and Hawke's Bay Regiment
Wellington Infantry Regiment
Wellington West Coast and Taranaki Regiment
West Nova Scotia Regiment
Witwatersrand Rifles Regiment

Y
Yorkshire Regiment (14th/15th, 19th & 33rd/76th Foot)

Z
Zambia Regiment

See also
List of Commonwealth Armoured Regiments

Infantry regiments